The women's cycling sprint at the 2016 Olympic Games in Rio de Janeiro took place on 14–16 August 2016.

The medals were presented by Timothy Fok, IOC member, Hong Kong and Brian Cookson, President of the UCI.

Competition format

The event is a single-elimination tournament after the qualifying phase via time trial. Each match pitted two cyclists against each other in the best-of-three races base on their seeding in the qualifying phase. Each race was three laps of the track with side-by-side starts.

Schedule
All times are Brasília Time (UTC-03:00)

Results

Qualification

First round

Heat 1

Heat 3

Heat 5

Heat 7

Heat 9

Heat 2

Heat 4

Heat 6

Heat 8

First round Repechage

Heat 1

Heat 2

Heat 3

Second round

Heat 1

Heat 3

Heat 5

Heat 2

Heat 4

Heat 6

Second round Repechage

Match 1

Match 2

9th–12th place classifications

Quarterfinals

Heat 1

 Heat 3

Heat 2

Heat 4

5th–8th place classifications

Semifinals

Heat 1

Heat 2

Finals

Bronze medal match

Gold medal match

References

sprint
Cycling at the Summer Olympics – Women's sprint
Women's events at the 2016 Summer Olympics
Olymp